Boyania is a genus of flowering plants belonging to the family Melastomataceae.

Its native range is Colombia and Guyana.

Species:

Boyania ayangannae 
Boyania colombiana

References

Melastomataceae
Melastomataceae genera